Heterocampa zayasi, the blue moor-grass moth or zaya heterocampa, is a species of moth in the family Notodontidae (the prominents). It was first described by Torre and Alayo in 1959 and it is found in Cuba.

The MONA or Hodges number for Heterocampa zayasi is 7997.

References

Further reading

 
 
 

Notodontidae
Articles created by Qbugbot
Moths described in 1959
Endemic fauna of Cuba